In computing, the modulo operation returns the remainder or signed remainder of a division, after one number is divided by another (called the modulus of the operation).

For example, the expression "5 mod 2" would evaluate to 1, because 5 divided by 2 has a quotient of 2 and a remainder of 1, while "9 mod 3" would evaluate to 0, because 9 divided by 3 has a quotient of 3 and a remainder of 0; there is nothing to subtract from 9 after multiplying 3 times 3.

See Modular arithmetic for an older and related convention applied in number theory.

Variants of the definition
In mathematics, the result of the modulo operation is an equivalence class, and any member of the class may be chosen as representative; however, the usual representative is the least positive residue, the smallest non-negative integer that belongs to that class (i.e., the remainder of the Euclidean division). However, other conventions are possible. Computers and calculators have various ways of storing and representing numbers; thus their definition of the modulo operation depends on the programming language or the underlying hardware.

In nearly all computing systems, the quotient  and the remainder  of  divided by  satisfy the following conditions:
 

However, this still leaves a sign ambiguity if the remainder is non-zero: two possible choices for the remainder occur, one negative and the other positive, and two possible choices for the quotient occur.

As described by Leijen,

However, truncated division satisfies the identity .

Notation

For environments lacking a similar function, any of the three definitions above can be used.

Common pitfalls
When the result of a modulo operation has the sign of the dividend (truncated definition), it can lead to surprising mistakes.

For example, to test if an integer is odd, one might be inclined to test if the remainder by 2 is equal to 1:

bool is_odd(int n) {
    return n % 2 == 1;
}

But in a language where modulo has the sign of the dividend, that is incorrect, because when  (the dividend) is negative and odd,  mod 2 returns −1, and the function returns false.

One correct alternative is to test that the remainder is not 0 (because remainder 0 is the same regardless of the signs):

bool is_odd(int n) {
    return n % 2 != 0;
}

Another alternative is to use the fact that for any odd number, the remainder may be either 1 or −1:

bool is_odd(int n) {
    return n % 2 == 1 || n % 2 == -1;
}

A simpler alternative is to treat the result of n % 2 as if it is a boolean value, where any non-zero value is true:

bool is_odd(int n) {
    return n % 2;
}

Performance issues
Modulo operations might be implemented such that a division with a remainder is calculated each time. For special cases, on some hardware, faster alternatives exist. For example, the modulo of powers of 2 can alternatively be expressed as a bitwise AND operation (assuming  is a positive integer, or using a non-truncating definition):
x % 2n == x & (2n - 1)

Examples:

In devices and software that implement bitwise operations more efficiently than modulo, these alternative forms can result in faster calculations.

This simple optimization is not possible for languages in which the result of the modulo operation has the sign of the dividend (including C), unless the dividend is of an unsigned integer type. This is because, if the dividend is negative, the modulo will be negative, whereas  will always be positive. For these languages, the equivalence x % 2n == x < 0 ? x | ~(2n - 1) : x & (2n - 1) has to be used instead, expressed using bitwise OR, NOT and AND operations.

Optimizations for general constant-modulus operations also exist by calculating the division first using the constant-divisor optimization.

Properties (identities)

Some modulo operations can be factored or expanded similarly to other mathematical operations. This may be useful in cryptography proofs, such as the Diffie–Hellman key exchange.
 Identity:
 .
 Inverse:
 .
 Distributive:
 .
 .
 Inverse multiplication:  .

In programming languages

In addition, many computer systems provide a  functionality, which produces the quotient and the remainder at the same time. Examples include the x86 architecture's  instruction, the C programming language's  function, and Python's  function.

Generalizations

Modulo with offset

In that case,  is called an offset. There does not seem to be a standard notation for this operation, so let us tentatively use . Clearly, the usual modulo operation corresponds to zero offset: . The operation of modulo with offset is related to the floor function as follows:

(To see this, let . We first show that . It is in general true that  for all integers ; thus, this is true also in the particular case when ; but that means that , which is what we wanted to prove. It remains to be shown that . Then , thus . Now take  and add  to both sides, obtaining . But we've seen that , so we are done. □)

The modulo with offset  is implemented in Mathematica as  .

Implementing other modulo definitions using truncation 
Despite the mathematical elegance of Knuth's floored division and Euclidean division, it is generally much more common to find a truncated division-based modulo in programming languages. Leijen provides the following algorithms for calculating the two divisions given a truncated integer division:

/* Euclidean and Floored divmod, in the style of C's ldiv() */
typedef struct {
  /* This structure is part of the C stdlib.h, but is reproduced here for clarity */
  long int quot;
  long int rem;
} ldiv_t;

/* Euclidean division */
inline ldiv_t ldivE(long numer, long denom) {
  /* The C99 and C++11 languages define both of these as truncating. */
  long q = numer / denom;
  long r = numer % denom;
  if (r < 0) {
    if (denom > 0) {
      q = q - 1;
      r = r + denom;
    } else {
      q = q + 1;
      r = r - denom;
    }
  }
  return (ldiv_t){.quot = q, .rem = r};
}

/* Floored division */
inline ldiv_t ldivF(long numer, long denom) {
  long q = numer / denom;
  long r = numer % denom;
  if ((r > 0 && denom < 0) || (r < 0 && denom > 0)) {
    q = q - 1;
    r = r + denom;
  }
  return (ldiv_t){.quot = q, .rem = r};
}

For both cases, the remainder can be calculated independently of the quotient, but not vice versa. The operations are combined here to save screen space, as the logical branches are the same.

See also
 Modulo (disambiguation) and modulo (jargon) – many uses of the word modulo, all of which grew out of Carl F. Gauss's introduction of modular arithmetic in 1801.
 Modulo (mathematics), general use of the term in mathematics
 Modular exponentiation
 Turn (angle)

Notes

References

External links
 Modulorama, animation of a cyclic representation of multiplication tables (explanation in French)

Computer arithmetic
Articles with example C++ code
Operators (programming)
Modular arithmetic
Operations on numbers

de:Division mit Rest#Modulo